Osman Mohammud Dufle is a Somali physician and politician. He previously served as a Minister of Health in the Transitional National Government of Somalia. He was also one of the founders of the Joint Medical Committee, a professional organization for doctors in the country. He served as a volunteer at the Keysaney Hospital in Mogadishu. In June 2014, he was nominated for a Nobel Prize in recognition of his humanitarian work.

References

Living people
Ethnic Somali people
20th-century Somalian physicians
Government ministers of Somalia
Year of birth missing (living people)